Jocey Joseph Ekwuazi, known professionally as Willie XO, is a Nigerian singer/songwriter based in the United Kingdom. He rose to prominence with the release of the song "comfort you", which gained him over 20 millions on views on YouTube.

Early life

Willie XO was born in London but spent his early childhood in Nigeria. He had a keen interest in Afrobeat music from a young age. As a child, his favourite musicians included Fela Kuti and Bob Marley. His first successful single, "Kraze", was released in 2017. and in other African and Caribbean countries.

Career 
In 2018, Willie XO collaborated with Tory Lanez and Popcaan on a commercially successful single, "Comfort You", which he advertised on billboards in London.  In 2019 Willie XO released the song titled Early In The Morning, featuring Ashanti

He is currently working through his own label SBMG Entertainment.  In August 2021, willie xo announced the release of his new single featuring british rapper, singer-songwriter, record producer Dappy through his instagram page after recently inking a deal with major label Atlantic Records.

Projects 
Willie XO has set up a  charity with the purpose of helping young people to start their own businesses. He has said that he wants to impact the lives of millions of people. He was introduced to the scene by Nigerian hip-hop recording artist, CEO of the talent managing outfit known as 'The Goretti Company', responsible for launching the careers of Phyno and Chidinma among others.

Controversy 
On April 19, 2021, willie xo was reported to have been involved in a collision with Runtown and accused him of owing him an undisclosed amount of money. In a viral video, willie xo was seen taking exception to runtown the singer made sure to tag the official Instagram handle of Runtown while telling him to pay up what he owes .

Discography

Singles

Music videos

References

External links
 

21st-century Nigerian male singers
Living people
Year of birth missing (living people)